SSTV may refer to:

 SS-TV (SS-Totenkopfverbände), the SS department responsible for administering the death camps
 Sistema Sandinista de Televisión, Nicaragua
 South Sudan Television
 Sur Sagar TV, Canada
 Slow-scan television,  a picture transmission method